Wang Jingzhi (born 28 August 1982, in Tanggu, Tianjin) is a Chinese sabre fencer, who competed at the 2004, 2008 and 2012 Summer Olympics. His biggest accomplishment is winning a gold medal at the 2010 Asian Games.

He married fencer Tan Xue in 2009.

See also
China at the 2008 Summer Olympics

References

1982 births
Living people
Chinese male fencers
Fencers at the 2004 Summer Olympics
Fencers at the 2008 Summer Olympics
Fencers at the 2012 Summer Olympics
Olympic fencers of China
Fencers from Tianjin
Asian Games medalists in fencing
Fencers at the 2002 Asian Games
Fencers at the 2006 Asian Games
Fencers at the 2010 Asian Games
Asian Games gold medalists for China
Asian Games silver medalists for China
Asian Games bronze medalists for China
Medalists at the 2002 Asian Games
Medalists at the 2006 Asian Games
Medalists at the 2010 Asian Games
Universiade medalists in fencing
Universiade gold medalists for China
Medalists at the 2009 Summer Universiade